was a Japanese general in the Imperial Japanese Army, Governor-General of Korea and Prime Minister of Japan from 1944 to 1945.

After Japan's defeat in World War II, he was convicted of war crimes and sentenced to life imprisonment. He died in prison in 1950.

Early life
Koiso was born on March 22, 1880, in Utsunomiya, Tochigi Prefecture, the first son of chief inspector of police and shizoku (former samurai) Koiso Susumu. He attended eight different schools, graduating from Yamagata Middle School (today Yamagata Prefectural Yamagata East High School). He was accepted as an officer candidate in 1898.

Military career
Koiso graduated from the Imperial Japanese Army Academy in 1900 and went on to attend the Army Staff College. Commissioned a 2nd Lieutenant in the 30th Infantry Regiment in June 1901, he was promoted to Lieutenant in November 1903. During the Russo-Japanese War, he served as Battalion Adjutant in September 1904, Company Commander in March 1905 and was promoted to captain in June 1905. 

In November 1910, Koiso graduated from the Army Staff College, 33rd in a class of 55, and returned to the Imperial Japanese Army Academy as an instructor in December 1910.

Reassigned to the Kwantung Army General Staff in September 1912, Koiso was promoted to major and Battalion Commander of the 2d Infantry Regiment in August 1914. He returned to the Imperial Japanese Army General Staff Headquarters in June 1915, was promoted to lieutenant colonel in July 1918, and seconded to the Imperial Japanese Army Air Service in July 1921. After his promotion to colonel in February 1922, he was sent as a military attaché to Europe in June 1922, returning to assume command of the IJA 51st Division in August 1923. Returning to the Army General Staff in May 1925, he was promoted to major general in December 1926 and lieutenant general in August 1931.

During the 1920s Koiso joined the relatively moderate Tōseiha (Control Faction) led by General Kazushige Ugaki, along with Gen Sugiyama, Yoshijirō Umezu, Tetsuzan Nagata, and Hideki Tōjō as opposed to the more radical Kōdōha (Action Faction) under Sadao Araki.

In February 1932, Koiso became Vice-Minister of War and in August 1932, concurrently Chief of Staff of the Kwantung Army. In March 1934, he was transferred to command the IJA 5th Division (Hiroshima). He then assumed command of the Chōsen Army in Korea from December 1935. Promoted to full general in November 1937, he joined the Army General Staff in July 1938.

Colonial affairs and Korea

Koiso left active duty in July 1938. From April to August 1939, he served in the cabinet of Prime Minister Hiranuma Kiichirō as Minister of Colonial Affairs. He returned to the same post again from January to July 1940 under the Yonai administration.

Koiso was appointed Governor-General of Korea from May 1942 to 1944, during which time he gained the nickname "The Tiger of Korea" for his looks rather than his military prowess. Koiso continued the integrationist policy (Naisen Ittai) of his predecessor Jirō Minami, promoting Korean officials within the administration, promoting Korean businesses, and making his govern more responsive to Koreans in general. On August 1, 1943 he imposed the highly unpopular universal military conscription of Koreans into the Japanese military.

When news of Korean independence reached him after the war, Koiso scoffed "the dream of Korean independence is as foolish as trying to plot the independence of Kyushu or Hokkaido."

Prime Minister
After the Allied landing in Normandy (June 6) and the successful capture of Saipan (9 July), the government of Hideki Tojo lost its credibility and a new cabinet was formed. In selecting a new Prime Minister, the elder statesmen narrowed the candidates down to three: Hisaichi Terauchi (commander of the Southern Expeditionary Army Group), Shunroku Hata (commander of the China Expeditionary Army), and Koiso.

The Army strongly favored General Hisaichi Terauchi; however, they could not afford to recall him to Japan from his role as commander-in-chief of all Japanese forces in Southeast Asia. The civilian government, especially Kōichi Kido and Fumimaro Konoe, also did not favor Koiso, due to Koiso's previous involvement with the ultranationalist Sakura Kai and its attempted coup d'état against the government in 1931 (i.e. the "March Incident"). These reservations were shared by the Emperor in his Privy Council meetings. Koiso was supported by Mitsumasa Yonai and Hiranuma Kiichirō, and as no consensus could be reached on a more suitable alternative, their arguments prevailed. Moreover,  Mitsumasa Yonai was appointed vice-Prime Minister as a way of dealing with strong objections to Koiso. 

Koiso attempted to end army-navy rivalry by creating a Supreme Chief of Staff (最高幕僚長), but this was structured to favor the army, thus bitter opposition from the navy doomed the plan. Instead, a Supreme War Guidance Council (最高戦争指導会議) was created (August 4 1944–August 22 1945). Koiso was not taken seriously at Council meetings, where he was openly contradicted by Hata Hikosaburo. Within the top levels of the Imperial Army, rumors circulated that the Koiso Cabinet would only last two months (it lasted nine months). 

Koiso's strategy for ending the war was to strike a hard blow against the American Army in the Philippines, forcing negotiations. However, the general entrusted with the defense of the Philippines, Tomoyuki Yamashita, disagreed with the planners in the Southern Expeditionary Army. As such, the Army and Navy could not agree on a coordinated plan. Nevertheless, the defenders were prepared to make considerable sacrifices when Douglas MacArthur invaded Leyte on October 17, with the first kamikaze attack carried out on October 21, and the Japanese Navy losing four aircraft carriers and three battleships during the Battle of Leyte Gulf. Although the strategy had failed, Koiso did not change his way of thinking. Late in 1944, Koiso still planned to send Prince Konoe on a peace mission to Switzerland and Sweden, but it came to nothing.

During the remainder of Koiso's term in office, Japanese forces continued to suffer a string of defeats on all fronts at the hands of the Allies. Also during his tenure, on November 10, 1944, Wang Jingwei died of pneumonia in a Japanese hospital in Nagoya, which effectively was the end of the Reorganized National Government of China in northern China. For a time, Koiso considered making peace, but he could not find a solution that would appease both the Japanese military and the Allies.  Left with little choice but to continue the war effort, Koiso tried to extend his power over the army by attempting to assume the position of War Minister concurrently with that of Prime Minister, but was unable to legally do so as he was on the reserve list. Koiso resigned in April 1945 when American forces invaded Okinawa and his demands to be included in military decisions were rejected, the same date the Imperial Japanese Navy flagship  was sunk by American aircraft during Operation Ten-Go.

Later career
Koiso was an ardent supporter of State Shintoism along with Heisuke Yanagawa, who directed the Government Imperial Aid Association. He restored the ancient sacred rites in the Sukumo river, near Hakone, the "Preliminary Misogi Rite".

After the end of World War II, Koiso was arrested by the Allied occupation powers and tried by the International Military Tribunal for the Far East for war crimes.  Upon conviction as a Class-A war criminal on counts 1, 27, 29, 31, 32 and 55, he was given a sentence of life imprisonment. The Tribunal specifically cited Koiso's decisive role in starting the wars against China and the Allies. "Furthermore, despite the fact that Kuniaki Koiso was not directly responsible for the war crimes committed by the Japanese Army, he took no measures to prevent them or to punish the perpetrators when, as Prime Minister, it was within his power to do so." Koiso died of esophageal cancer in Sugamo Prison in 1950. His grave is at the Aoyama Cemetery in central Tokyo.

Honors
From the corresponding article in the Japanese Wikipedia

Grand Cordon of the Order of the Rising Sun (April 5, 1934)
Grand Cordon of the Order of the Sacred Treasure (April 29, 1934)
Order of the Golden Kite, 2nd class (April 29, 1934)

References

Books

Sources

External links 

|-

|-

|-

1880 births
1950 deaths
20th-century prime ministers of Japan
People from Utsunomiya, Tochigi
Imperial Japanese Army generals of World War II
Japanese generals
Governors-General of Korea
Japanese people convicted of war crimes
Japanese military personnel of the Russo-Japanese War
Japanese military personnel of World War II
World War II political leaders
Prime Ministers of Japan
Recipients of the Order of the Rising Sun
Recipients of the Order of the Sacred Treasure
Recipients of the Order of the Golden Kite
Japanese people convicted of the international crime of aggression
Japanese people convicted of crimes against humanity
Japanese prisoners sentenced to life imprisonment
Prisoners sentenced to life imprisonment by international courts and tribunals
People convicted by the International Military Tribunal for the Far East
Japanese people who died in prison custody
Deaths from cancer in Japan
Deaths from esophageal cancer
Ministers of former Japanese ministries
Japanese politicians convicted of crimes
Heads of government convicted of war crimes
Heads of government who were later imprisoned